Jane A. Blakeley Stickle (1817-1896) was an American artist. She is most known for a quilt she completed in 1863, known as the 'Dear Jane' quilt.

Early life
Jane A. Blakeley was born in Shaftsbury, Vermont on April 8, 1817. She was married to Walter Stickle and together they took in at least three local children. In the 1860 census, Jane Stickle was recorded as living apart from her husband. She was also recorded as being an invalid, and though she would reunite with her husband before his death, it is thought that she completed her quilt during her illness and separation from him.

Quilt
Stickle's magnum opus quilt was created of linen and cotton and is composed of 5602 pieces. These pieces make 169 blocks measuring five inches square, and a scalloped border. Stickle embroidered her name and the words “In War Time 1863”, and the number of pieces used into one corner of the quilt. She also embroidered the initials 'SB' on the back, a reference to her mother Sarah Blakeley who had given her the linen fabric. Stickle used many different fabrics in her quilt, and each printed fabric appears in only one block on the quilt. It has been determined that while 30% of the block patterns on the quilt were documented traditional blocks, the bulk of the designs were created by Stickle.

In October of 1862, the Bennington Banner reported that Stickle had won a prize of $2 for the “Best patched quilt” at the county agricultural fair.

The quilt is in the permanent collection of Bennington Museum. It is exhibited for short periods of time in the autumn of each year to reduce wear and aging. It has also been exhibited virtually. 

In 1996, Brenda Papadakis published Dear Jane: The Two Hundred Twenty-five Patterns from the 1863 Jane A. Stickle Quilt, sparking global interest in the quilt, which, through the book's title became known as the Dear Jane Quilt. Modern quilters now create their own Dear Jane quilts. Many books, kits, software, and patterns exist to aid quilters in their Dear Jane projects.

Further reading

References

Quilters
People from Shaftsbury, Vermont
Burials in Vermont
1896 deaths
19th-century American women artists
American textile artists
19th-century women textile artists
19th-century textile artists
Artists from Vermont